Rangan (also Romanized as Rangan; also known as Rangan) is a village in Mazul Rural District, in the Central District of Nishapur County, Razavi Khorasan Province, Iran. At the 2006 census, its population was 146, in 38 families.

References 

Populated places in Nishapur County